The Finsterwalder Perfex is a German high-wing, single-place, hang glider, designed and produced by Finsterwalder.

Design and development
The Perfex and the smaller sized Lightfex are intended as man-packable single-surface beginner gliders for recreational flying. As such the Perfex weighs only  and can be reduced to a folded size of 

The aircraft is made from aluminum tubing, with the wing covered in Dacron sailcloth. Its  span wing is cable braced from a single kingpost. The nose angle is 120° and the aspect ratio is 5.5:1.

Variants
Lightfex
DHV certified as Class 2.
Perfex
DHV certified as Class 1-2.

Specifications (Perfex)

References

External links

Hang gliders